Oliver Lee Pitts (March 23, 1916 – March 19, 2020) was an American journalist, sailor, restaurateur, and banker. He was the owner of the White Horse Tavern in Newport, Rhode Island from 1981 to 2006.

References

1916 births
2020 deaths
People from Fort Worth, Texas
Journalists from Texas
Businesspeople from Texas
American bankers
American centenarians
Men centenarians
American restaurateurs
American sailors